IFK Visby is a Swedish football club located in Visby on the island of Gotland.

Background
IFK Visby currently plays in Division 4 Gotland which is the sixth tier of Swedish football. They play their home matches at the Västerhejde IP in Visby.

The club is affiliated to Gotlands Fotbollförbund. IFK Visby have competed in the Svenska Cupen on 2 occasions and have played 2 matches in the competition.

Season to season

Footnotes

External links
 IFK Visby – Official website
 IFK Visby on Facebook

Sport in Visby
Football clubs in Gotland County
Idrottsföreningen Kamraterna